Paul Hornback (born in Shelbyville, Kentucky) is an American politician and former Republican member of the Kentucky Senate. Hornback represented District 20 from January 4, 2011, to January 1, 2023.

Education
Hornback graduated from Shelby County High School.

Elections
February 24, 2023.
2022 Hornback did not run for re-election.
2018 Hornback was unopposed in the May 22, 2018, Republican Primary and defeated Democratic nominee Dave Suetholz in the November 6, 2018, general election winning with 25,775 votes (56.5%).
2014 Hornback won the May 20, 2014, Republican Primary with 6,079 votes (82.9%) against Tony McCurdy. Paul Hornback was unopposed in the November 4, 2014, general election.
2010 When District 20 Senator Gary Tapp retired and left the seat open, Hornback won the May 18, 2010, Republican Primary with 5,328 votes (62.9%) and won the November 2, 2010, General election with 26,883 votes (60.5%) against Democratic nominee David Eaton, who had run for a House seat in 2002 and 2004.

References

External links
Official page at the Kentucky General Assembly

Paul Hornback at Ballotpedia
Paul Hornback at OpenSecrets

Year of birth missing (living people)
Living people
Republican Party Kentucky state senators
People from Shelbyville, Kentucky
21st-century American politicians